Mark Knowles and Daniel Nestor were the defending champions, but did not compete together. Knowles partnered with Mahesh Bhupathi, but lost in the first round to Stephen Huss and Ross Hutchins.
Nestor partnered with Nenad Zimonjić, and reached the final before losing to Pablo Cuevas and Luis Horna.

Seeds

Draw

Finals

Top half

Section 1

Section 2

Bottom half

Section 3

Section 4

External links
Draw
2008 French Open – Men's draws and results at the International Tennis Federation

Men's Doubles
French Open by year – Men's doubles
French Open